Mağusa Türk Gücü Spor Kulübü is a Turkish Cypriot sports club based in Famagusta.

History
Mağusa Türk Gücü last won the title of champions of the Turkish-Cypriot Football League Birinci Lig in the 2018–19 season in Northern Cyprus. The club colors are yellow and green. Home stadium of the club is the Dr. Fazıl Küçük Stadyumu, which is a multi-use stadium in Famagusta. It is currently used mostly for football matches and hosted some matches for 2006 ELF Cup.  The stadium holds 7,000 people.

The MTG also has a successful volleyball team competing nationally as well as a thriving chess club.

Cameroonian international Eyong Enoh played for the team in 2005

Notable Chairmen
 Ersoy İnce

External links
 Mağusa Türk Gücü | Facebook

References 

Sport in Famagusta
Football clubs in Northern Cyprus
1945 establishments in Cyprus